Consentidos (translation of: Spoiled's) was an Argentine children's comedy in daily television series that was broadcast on Channel 13 and produced by Ideas del Sur together with Televisa. The series premiered on November 9, 2009 and ended on July 8, 2010. It starred Natalie Pérez, Michel Noher, Claribel Medina and Marcelo de Bellis. The main antagonistic characters are: Mariana Prommel and Macarena Paz.

Synopsis 
Tormented by her memories and in search of her sister, Luna Guzmán goes to work at a boarding school, where they study spoiled and spoiled children that by name takes the Mastery School where she discovers that her lost sister is Miranda, the daughter of Victoria, the director. Miranda is a spoiled, capricious and selfish girl. The first day that comes to work Luna is the day of her birthday and treats her badly thought that Luna is only a fit. Alejo the lost son of the director also enters there as a gym teacher, the story takes through Luna, Miranda, Alejo, Ivo, Valentina, Benja and Candy and the entry of new students to the Mastery School and the truth of who they are. The story ends with a double wedding and the truth of each one.

Cast

Main 

Claribel Medina as Victoria Mujica de García
Marcelo de Bellis as Guillermo Guzmán
Natalie Pérez as Luna Guzmán / Luna Moreno
Michel Noher as Alejo Briceño / Diego García Mujica
Macarena Paz as Renata De Briceño / Lucila
Mauricio Dayub as Patricio
Mariana Prommel as Rita
Mario Guerci as Nano
Fabio Di Tomaso as Felipe de la Fuente
Pepe Monje as Diego Miraflores
Rodolfo Samso as Rolando Marconi
Daniel Di Biase as Juan Moreno
Julio Viera as Pedro Alonso
Tomás de las Heras as Max
Micaela Riera as Valentina
Andrés Gil as Ivo
Valentino Giovanetti as Ulises
Christian Puebla as Paul
Eva De Dominici as Gal
Paloma González Heredia as Miranda García Mujica 
Manuel Ramos as Toto
Ivan Paz as Juanse
Agustina Palma as Julieta
Lola Morán as Emma Gómez Rañero

Teen and child cast 

Agustina García Tedesco as Serena
Luciano Papasidero as Dino
Lucas Verstraeten as Tom González Crespo
Delfina Capalbo as Federica
Ramiro López Silveyra as Rafa
Antonella Sabatini as Celeste Regueiro
Nazareno Antón as Gerónimo
Franco Gil Franchina as Nicolás
Chiara Francia as Lila
Tomás Ross as Benjamín
Luciano Martínez Motta as Bautista
Lourdes Mansilla as Candy
Maya Schojet as Pilar
Juana Barros as Clara
Tupac Larriera as Tupac
Marcio Mansilla as Augusto
Brian Sichel as Rodrigo
Julieta Poggio as Olivia
Thelma Fardin as Luz
Thiago Batistuta as Martín
Jaime Domínguez as Lisandro

Seasons

References

Argentine comedy television series
2010s Argentine comedy television series
2010 Argentine television series debuts
2011 Argentine television series endings
Spanish-language television shows